James Roy Walker (April 13, 1893 – February 10, 1962) was a Major League Baseball pitcher who played for six seasons. He pitched for the Cleveland Naps/Indians in 1912 and 1915, the Chicago Cubs from 1917 to 1918, and the St. Louis Cardinals from 1921 to 1922.

External links

1893 births
1962 deaths
Cleveland Naps players
Cleveland Indians players
Chicago Cubs players
St. Louis Cardinals players
Major League Baseball pitchers
Baseball players from Tennessee
New Orleans Pelicans (baseball) players
Toledo Mud Hens players
Columbus Senators players
Milwaukee Brewers (minor league) players
Knoxville Smokies players
Shreveport Sports players
Birmingham Barons players
People from Lawrenceburg, Tennessee
Nashville Vols players